The  is a history museum in Kagoshima, Japan. Located by the Kōtsuki River, it is a gallery where visitors can learn about the Meiji Restoration. In the basement hall, sound, light, and robots are used to present a three-dimensional experience of the Meiji Restoration. On the first floor, exhibits describe the people, things, and events of Satsuma Province.

See also
 Satsuma Domain
 Shimazu Hisamitsu
 Saigō Takamori
 Ōkubo Toshimichi
 Bakumatsu

External links

Official website 

Buildings and structures in Kagoshima
Meiji Restoration
Satsuma Province
Museums in Kagoshima Prefecture
History museums in Japan